Vicques may refer to the following places:

Vicques, Switzerland, in the canton of Jura
site of the Jura Observatory
Vicques, Calvados, in France